Alain Cavalier (born 14 September 1931) is a French film director.

Biography
Cavalier was born in Vendôme, Loir-et-Cher and studied film at the Institut des hautes études cinématographiques. He won several awards, including the César Award for Best Film and César Award for Best Director for his film Thérèse in 1987. His latest film Pater premiered In Competition at the 2011 Cannes Film Festival.

He was married to the French film actress and former Miss France winner Irène Tunc.

Filmography 
 1958 : Un Américain (court métrage)
 1962 : Le Combat dans l'île
 1964 : L'Insoumis
 1967 : Mise à sac
 1968 : La Chamade
 1976 : Le Plein de super
 1979 : Ce répondeur ne prend pas de message
 1979 : Martin et Léa
 1981 : Un étrange voyage
 1986 : Thérèse
 1987 : 24 portraits d'Alain Cavalier (1ère partie)
 1991 : 24 portraits d'Alain Cavalier (2ème partie)
 1993 : Libera Me
 1996 : La Rencontre
 1998 : Georges de la Tour (documentaire)
 2000 : Vies
 2001 : René
 2004 : Le Filmeur
 2005 : Bonnard (moyen-métrage)
 2007 : Les Braves (documentaire)
 2007 : Lieux saints (moyen-métrage)
 2009 : Irène
 2009 : Sept gouttes de sommeil (moyen-métrage)
 2011 : Pater
 2014 : Le Paradis
 2015 : Le Caravage
 2017 : Six portraits XL
 2019 : To Be Alive and Know It

References

External links
 

1931 births
Living people
French film directors
Best Director César Award winners
People from Vendôme